Elaine Smith (born 23 April 1962) is a Scottish-Australian former actress who found fame on television series Neighbours in 1985 as original character Daphne Clarke.

Biography
Smith auditioned for a guest role in new series Neighbours in 1984. However her appearance, particularly her short spiky hair, caught the attention of the casting director and she was cast as regular character Daphne Lawrence. Smith continued in the role until 1988. Prior to this she had a small guest role in soap opera Sons and Daughters in 1984 as a flight attendant.

Subsequent credits include The Flying Doctors, State Coroner, Always Greener, Home and Away and All Saints in 2006. She returned to University to earn a degree in teaching, and as of 2017 worked as a drama and primary school teacher in an inner west Sydney public school.

Filmography

Film

Television

Personal life
Smith is married to actor and writer, Jonathan Biggins. The couple met while performing together in a Melbourne play. Smith and Biggins have twin daughters, who were born in February 2000.

References

External links
 

1962 births
Australian schoolteachers
Australian television actresses
Living people
People from Largs
Scottish emigrants to Australia